Marika Zanforlin (born 21 June 1983 in Rovigo) is an Italian pairs figure skater and roller skater. With partner Federico Degli Esposti, she is the 2003-2006 World Roller Skating Pair Champion. They started competing together in roller skating in 1996. They switched to figure skating in June 2007. They are the 2008 & 2009 Italian silver medalists.

Figure skating competitive highlights
(with Degli Esposti)

References

External links
 Official site

Italian female pair skaters
Italian roller skaters
1983 births
Living people
People from Rovigo
Sportspeople from the Province of Rovigo
20th-century Italian women
21st-century Italian women